Uzhhorod Raion is one of the raions (districts) of Zakarpattia Oblast in western Ukraine. Its administrative center is located in the city of Uzhhorod. Over 30% of population in the raion speak the Hungarian language according to the latest census. Population: 

On 18 July 2020, as part of the administrative reform of Ukraine, the number of raions of Zakarpattia Oblast was reduced to six, and the area of Uzhhorod Raion was significantly expanded. The January 2020 estimate of the raion population was 

Some Romanians live in this raion.

Names

Administrative division
The raion is divided into one town council and 35 village councils. Some village councils combine several individual villages. In 16 out 64 villages the Hungarian speaking population accounts for over 70%. There is a sizeable Roma community in the town of Serednie.

Urban-type settlements

Villages

See also
 Administrative divisions of Zakarpattia Oblast

References

 
Raions of Zakarpattia Oblast
1953 establishments in Ukraine